The 1985 U.S. Clay Court Championships was a men's Grand Prix and women's Championship Series tennis tournament held at the Indianapolis Tennis Center in Indianapolis in the United States and played on outdoor clay courts. It was the 17th edition of the tournament and was held from July 21 to July 29, 1985. Ivan Lendl and Andrea Temesvári won the singles titles.

Finals

Men's singles

 Ivan Lendl defeated  Andrés Gómez 6–1, 6–3
 It was Lendl's 5th title of the year and the 47th of his career.

Women's singles

 Andrea Temesvári defeated  Zina Garrison 7–6(7–0), 6–3

Men's doubles

 Ken Flach /  Robert Seguso defeated  Pavel Složil /  Kim Warwick 6–4, 6–4

Women's doubles

 Katerina Maleeva /  Manuela Maleeva defeated  Penny Barg /  Paula Smith 2–6, 6–3, 6–4

References

External links 

 
U.S. Clay Court Championships
U.S. Clay Court Championships
U.S. Clay Court Championships
U.S. Clay Court Championships